The president of the Senate of Puerto Rico is the highest-ranking officer and the presiding officer of the Senate of Puerto Rico. The president has voting powers as it is elected amongst the own members of the Senate as established by Article III of the Constitution of Puerto Rico. The Constitution, however, does not establish its functions and since the Senate is the only body authorized by the Constitution to regulate its own internal affairs, the functions of the president vary from session to session—save being called "President" as the Constitution establishes. The president is typically elected during the Senate's inaugural session.

When absent, the president is substituted by the president pro tempore. Its counterpart in the House is the speaker.

The current president is Jose Luis Dalmau, senator at-large from the Popular Democratic Party

Background

The president traces its history back to more than  years ago when the Jones–Shafroth Act formally established the post on March 2, 1917. Said act was eventually superseded by another law, and the post was eventually established by the Constitution of Puerto Rico, specifically Article III, which establishes that, "The Senate shall elect a President [...] from among [its] members." The Constitution, however, does not establish what a "president" is nor what its function should be. Internal rules adopted by the Senate through a simple resolution establish its definition, functions, responsibilities, and legal scope.

Functions
Typically the president is responsible for the observance and compliance of the Senate's internal rules. He also typically:

 presides all Senate meetings
 resolves and decides all parliamentary situations and rules of order brought in sessions,
 names all permanent and special commissions of the Senate,
 signs all bills, joint resolutions, concurrent resolutions, reorganization plans, and simple resolutions approved by the Senate and the Legislative Assembly,
 convenes special sessions of the Senate,
 maintains order and decorum in the Senate, a responsibility typically delegated to the Sergeant-at-Arms of the Senate,
 must vote in all matters presented in the Senate (can not abstain),
 represents the Senate in all forums,
 is responsible for all administrative matters of the Senate, a responsibility typically delegated to the Secretary of the Senate,
 appoints an internal auditor for the Senate,
 prepares a registry of all lobbyists that must be freely available to the public,
 is responsible of providing free access to the public to all works generated by the Senate, and
 offers training and continuing education opportunities to Senate members, advisors, and employees.

Presidents

References

Officers of the Senate of Puerto Rico